The 2009-2010 ABA season was the ninth season of the American Basketball Association that lasted from November 2009 and ended with the three-game championship series between the Kentucky Bisons and the Southeast Texas Mavericks at the end of March 2010. The Mavericks won the championship series, two games to one after an 85-76 win March 30 for their first title.

League changes
For the first time, the league championship was played in a three-game series, between the Kentucky Bisons and Southeast Texas Mavericks, a series in which was won by the Mavericks, two games to one.

Regular season standings
These are the 2009-2010 regular season standings. Many franchises folded during the season, resulting in very few games being played for a lot of teams.

Postseason

Note:  Finals was a best of 3 series.
Note:  ABA did not release the game results for the first round or the winners of the regional first round tournaments.

References

American Basketball Association (2000–present) seasons
ABA